St Begh's Church or St Begh's Priory Church is a Roman Catholic parish church in Whitehaven, Cumbria, England. It was built from 1865 to 1868 and designed by E. W. Pugin in the Gothic Revival style. It was founded and is still administered by the Benedictines from Belmont Abbey, Herefordshire. It is located on the Coach Road in the Corkickle part of Whitehaven. It is a Grade II listed building.

History

Foundation
In 1706, Benedictines from Douai in France came to Whitehaven and started a mission serving the local Catholic population in Whitehaven. The founder of the mission was Dom Francis Rich. In 1785, a chapel was built, it was located probably close to Catherine Street in the town centre. In 1824, with the Catholic population of the town increasing and the patronage of the local Lowther family of baronets, the chapel was expanded.

Construction
In 1834, the site of the current church was given to the Benedictines by William Lowther, 1st Earl of Lonsdale. That year, a chapel was built on the site. In 1865, the foundation stone of the current church was laid. The church was designed by E. W. Pugin, who also designed Killarney Cathedral and Shrewsbury Cathedral. The construction was done by a Mr Cousins of Whitehaven and the stoen carving was done by Mr Pickering of Carlisle. In 1868, the church was opened and the total cost was £6,000. As St Begh's Church was the first Roman Catholic church in Whitehaven since the Reformation, it became a centre from where other missions were started from. Some of these missions grew and new churches were built, such as St Gregory and St Patrick Church on Quay Street in Whitehaven, which was built in 1889.

Parish

St Begh's Church is the parish church and in the same parish is St Gregory and St Patrick's Church, which is also served by Benedictine priests from Belmont Abbey. St Begh's Church has two Sunday Masses at 4:45pm on Saturday and 10:00am on Sunday. St Gregory and St Patrick's Church on Quay Street has one Sunday Mass at 8:30am.

See also
 Belmont Abbey, Herefordshire
 Diocese of Lancaster

References

External links
 

E. W. Pugin church buildings
Roman Catholic churches in Cumbria
Roman Catholic Diocese of Lancaster
Grade II listed churches in Cumbria
Gothic Revival church buildings in England
Gothic Revival architecture in Cumbria
19th-century Roman Catholic church buildings in the United Kingdom
Roman Catholic churches completed in 1868
1834 establishments in England
Whitehaven
Benedictine churches in the United Kingdom
Grade II listed Roman Catholic churches in England